MLM or mlm may refer to:

Organizations
 Multi-level marketing, or pyramid selling
 The NYSE stock symbol of Martin Marietta Materials
 Military liaison missions of the victors of World War II
 Missouri Lumber and Mining Company

Science and technology
 Medical logic module, of a healthcare knowledge base
 Millilumen (mlm), a unit of luminous flux
 Multi-layer mask, in multi-project wafer service in semiconductor fabrication  
 Multipurpose Laboratory Module or Nauka, a Russian module of the International Space Station.

Transportation
 Morelia International Airport's IATA airport code
 Millom railway station, England (station code)

Other uses
 Marxism–Leninism–Maoism

See also
 Man loving man, or MLM, another term for Men who have sex with men